Charles Albert "Dutch" Ruppersberger III (born January 31, 1946) is an American lawyer and politician serving as the U.S. representative for  since 2003. A member of the Democratic Party, he served as an assistant state attorney of Maryland from 1972 to 1980, a Baltimore County councilman from 1985 to 1994, and Baltimore County Executive from 1994 until 2002. He was the ranking member of the United States House Permanent Select Committee on Intelligence from 2011 to 2015.

Early life, education and career
Ruppersberger was born in Baltimore, the son of Margaret "Peggy" (née Wilson) and Charles Albert "Al" Ruppersberger, Jr. He is of part German descent. He graduated from Baltimore City College and attended the University of Maryland, College Park, where he played lacrosse. He earned his Juris Doctor (JD) from the University of Baltimore School of Law.

Ruppersberger began his career as a Baltimore County Assistant State's Attorney. He was soon promoted to chief of the State's Attorney Office Investigative Division, pursuing organized crime, political corruption, and drug trafficking. He was elected to the Baltimore County Council in 1985 and again in 1989, chosen twice as council chairman. In 1994 and 1998, he was elected Baltimore County Executive.

U.S. House of Representatives

Committee assignments
Committee on Appropriations
Subcommittee on Defense
Subcommittee on State, Foreign Operations, and Related Programs

Previous
Permanent Select Committee on Intelligence (Ranking Member, 113th and 114th Congresses)

Caucus memberships
 Congressional NextGen 9-1-1 Caucus
United States Congressional International Conservation Caucus
U.S.-Japan Caucus

Party leadership

Ruppersberger was the first Democrat freshman to be appointed to the House Intelligence Committee. He was named to this committee because his district is home to the National Security Agency. From 2011 to 2015, he served as the committee's ranking Democrat. The position placed Ruppersberger on the elite "Gang of Eight", the chairs and ranking members of the U.S. House and Senate Intelligence Committees along with the Senate Majority Leader, Senate Minority Leader, House Speaker and House Minority Leader. By law, the president must keep the Gang of Eight informed of the country's most secret intelligence activities to maintain proper oversight.

Shock trauma
Ruppersberger decided to run for office after a near-fatal car accident while investigating a drug trafficking case. He served as vice chairman on the board of visitors for the hospital that saved his life. He also serves on the United States Naval Academy Board of Visitors.

Agriculture 
In September 2019, Ruppersberger was one of nine lawmakers who signed a letter to Agriculture Secretary Sonny Perdue urging him to reconsider a proposed rule change that would affect the number of Americans that qualified for SNAP, noting that it would be "Maryland’s most vulnerable residents, including children, seniors, and people with disabilities, who would suffer the painful consequences of unnecessary and preventable hunger."

Operation Hero Miles
In 2003, Ruppersberger created the national "Hero Miles" program to allow Americans to donate their frequent flyer miles to wounded warriors recovering at military or Veterans Administration medical centers as well as to friends and family visiting them. In 2012, he authored legislation expanding the program to enable Americans to donate their hotel reward points to military families. Both the Hero Miles and Hotels for Heroes programs are administered by Fisher House, a nonprofit organization that opens its homes to military families visiting their injured loved ones at hospitals across the country. He won a Charles Dick Medal of Merit in 2004 for this initiative, becoming the last Marylander to win this award, which was previously awarded to U.S. Representative Beverly Byron (1992), State Senator John Astle (1993), U.S. Senator Barbara Mikulski (1994), U.S. Representative Roscoe Bartlett (1998) and State Delegate Peter Franchot (1999).

Municipal finance
Ruppersberger is an advocate of municipal finance and tax-exempt municipal bonds. In 2013, he and Representative Randy Hultgren secured the signatures of 137 other House members in a letter to congressional leaders asking that they "reject any proposal to cap or eliminate the deduction on tax-exempt municipal bonds used to finance the vast majority of infrastructure projects in America's communities." They circulated a similar letter in 2015 and formed the Municipal Finance Caucus in 2016.

Cyber Intelligence Sharing and Protection Act
Ruppersberger and Representative Mike Rogers co-sponsored the Cyber Intelligence Sharing and Protection Act, designed to increase intelligence sharing between private cyber security firms and government agencies. More than 60 businesses and trade organizations submitted letters of support, including the U.S. Chamber of Commerce, Time Warner, Verizon and AT&T, IBM and Intel. Despite several amendments to address privacy concerns, some groups, such as the Electronic Frontier Foundation, have criticized the act for lacking civil liberties protections, claiming that it authorizes government surveillance of private communications and allows companies to hand over large amounts of personal information on their clients without a warrant or judicial oversight, thereby creating a cybersecurity loophole in existing privacy laws, such as the Wiretap Act and the Electronic Communications Privacy Act. CISPA passed the House of Representatives on April 26, 2012. It was reintroduced into the House on February 13, 2013, and passed on April 18 by a bipartisan vote of 288–127. Of the 92 Democrats who supported the bill, many of them cited significant privacy improvements over the 2012 version.

Biosecurity 
On October 19, 2017, at the Emergent Biosolutions manufacturing facility in Maryland, Ruppersberger received the Congressional Biosecurity Champion Award from the Alliance for Biosecurity, a D.C.-based public-interest organization, for "his leadership and actions taken in Congress to improve U.S. national security, preparedness and response for biosecurity threats." He was one of eight members of Congress to receive the award.

Syria 
After President Donald Trump launched an airstrike on Syria in April 2017, Ruppersberger expressed hope that "Russia and Iran stand by the international community in condemning Assad's use of chemical weapons and cooperate in finding an appropriate way forward", and said the U.S. needed "a larger, thoughtful strategy to address the situation in Syria, including the defeat of ISIS."

In October 2019, Ruppersberger said he was concerned "about the instability now in the entire Middle East, and now we're really helping to make Russia even stronger in the Middle East", and that American troops were expressing concern and embarrassment over leaving behind the Kurds.

Yemeni civil war 
In December 2018, The Young Turks reported that Ruppersberger, "one of five Democrats who joined the majority of House Republicans to block debate on the war in Yemen, had met with Saudi officials and foreign agents representing them on numerous occasions".

In February 2019, Ruppersberger voted for Ro Khanna's resolution to direct the removal of U.S. armed forces from hostilities in the Republic of Yemen that have not been authorized by Congress.

Political campaigns

Barred from a third term as county executive, Ruppersberger opted to run for Congress in 2002 after 2nd district Congressman Bob Ehrlich ran for governor. The Maryland General Assembly significantly altered the 2nd by shifting most of its share of heavily Republican Harford County to the already Republican-leaning 1st and 6th districts, respectively based on the Eastern Shore and in Western Maryland. In its place, the legislature added a heavily Democratic portion of Baltimore City that had previously been in the 1st district. This turned the 2nd from a swing district into a strongly Democratic district.

Before running for Congress, Ruppersberger legally changed his name so that his lifelong nickname, "Dutch," could appear on the ballot.

An August 2011 editorial by The Washington Post called the 2nd district "curlicue territories strung together by impossibly delicate tendrils of land" and "a crazy-quilt confection drawn for the express purpose of ousting the incumbent at the time, Rep. (and later Gov.) Robert L. "Bob" Ehrlich Jr., a Republican, and installing C.A. Dutch Ruppersberger, a Democrat who still holds the job." He defeated Republican nominee Helen Delich Bentley, who had represented the 2nd district from 1985 to 1995, with 55% of the vote. He has never faced another close contest and has been reelected ten times.

Electoral history

Personal life
Ruppersberger married his high school sweetheart Kay Murphy in 1971 and has two children and five grandchildren.

References

External links

Congressman C.A. Dutch Ruppersberger official U.S. House website
Dutch Ruppersberger for Congress

 

|-

|-

1946 births
21st-century American politicians
Methodists from Maryland
American Methodists
American people of German descent
Baltimore City College alumni
Baltimore County Executives
Democratic Party members of the United States House of Representatives from Maryland
Living people
Maryland Terrapins men's lacrosse players
University of Baltimore School of Law alumni